This is a list of years in Brazil. See also the timeline of Brazilian history.  For only articles about years in Brazil that have been written, see :Category:Years in Brazil.

Twenty-first century

Twentieth century

Nineteenth century

See also 
Cities in Brazil
 Timeline of Brasília
 Timeline of Curitiba
 Timeline of Fortaleza
 Timeline of Manaus
 Timeline of Recife
 Timeline of Rio de Janeiro
 Timeline of Salvador, Bahia
 Timeline of São Paulo

Further reading

External links
 

 
Brazil history-related lists
Brazil